In geometry, a solid of revolution is a solid figure obtained by rotating a plane figure around some straight line (the axis of revolution) that lies on the same plane. The surface created by this revolution and which bounds the solid is the surface of revolution.

Assuming that the curve does not cross the axis, the solid's volume is equal to the length of the circle described by the figure's centroid multiplied by the figure's area (Pappus's second centroid theorem).

A representative disc is a three-dimensional volume element of a solid of revolution.  The element is created by rotating a line segment (of length ) around some axis (located  units away), so that a cylindrical volume of  units is enclosed.

Finding the volume
Two common methods for finding the volume of a solid of revolution are the disc method and the shell method of integration. To apply these methods, it is easiest to draw the graph in question; identify the area that is to be revolved about the axis of revolution; determine the volume of either a disc-shaped slice of the solid, with thickness , or a cylindrical shell of width ; and then find the limiting sum of these volumes as  approaches 0, a value which may be found by evaluating a suitable integral. A more rigorous justification can be given by attempting to evaluate a triple integral in cylindrical coordinates with two different orders of integration.

Disc method

The disc method is used when the slice that was drawn is perpendicular to the axis of revolution; i.e. when integrating parallel to the axis of revolution.

If  (e.g. revolving an area between the curve and the -axis), this reduces to:

The volume of each infinitesimal disc is therefore .

Assuming the applicability of Fubini's theorem and the multivariate change of variables formula, the disk method may be derived in a straightforward manner by (denoting the solid as D):

Cylinder method

The cylinder method is used when the slice that was drawn is parallel to the axis of revolution; i.e. when integrating perpendicular to the axis of revolution.

If  (e.g. revolving an area between curve and -axis), this reduces to:

Summing up all of the surface areas along the interval gives the total volume.

This method may be derived with the same triple integral, this time with a different order of integration:

Parametric form

When a curve is defined by its parametric form  in some interval , the volumes of the solids generated by revolving the curve around the -axis or the -axis are given by

Under the same circumstances the areas of the surfaces of the solids generated by revolving the curve around the -axis or the -axis are given by

Polar form 
For a polar curve  where , the volumes of the solids generated by revolving the curve around the x-axis or y-axis are

The areas of the surfaces of the solids generated by revolving the curve around the -axis or the -axis are given

See also

 Gabriel's Horn
 Guldinus theorem
 Pseudosphere
 Surface of revolution
 Ungula

Notes

References 
 


Integral calculus
Solids